The Last of Us Part II is a 2020 action-adventure game developed by Naughty Dog and published by Sony Interactive Entertainment. Set four years after The Last of Us (2013), the game focuses on two playable characters in a post-apocalyptic United States whose lives intertwine: Ellie, who sets out for revenge after suffering a tragedy, and Abby, a soldier who becomes involved in a conflict between her militia and a religious cult. The game was announced at the PlayStation Experience event on December 3, 2016, and was widely anticipated. It was named Most Anticipated Game of the Year by readers of PlayStation Blog in 2017, Most Wanted Game at the Golden Joystick Awards in 2017 and 2018, and Most Anticipated Game at The Game Awards 2017 and the Gamers' Choice Awards. It received Special Commendations for Graphics and Sound at the Game Critics Awards in July 2018.

The game was released worldwide on June 19, 2020, for the PlayStation 4 console. It received "universal acclaim" from critics, according to review aggregator Metacritic. It had the biggest launch of 2020 for both physical and digital sales, selling over four million copies in its release weekend and becoming the fastest-selling PlayStation 4 exclusive. The Last of Us Part II broke the record for most Game of the Year awards set by The Witcher 3: Wild Hunt (2015); it was later surpassed by Elden Ring (2022). The game was awarded from outlets and shows such as Den of Geek, Digital Trends, Electronic Gaming Monthly, Empire, Entertainment Weekly, Game Informer, PlayStation Blog, Push Square, and the Titanium Awards. it was named runner-up by several other publications. The Last of Us Part II was ranked among the best games of its generation by Game Informer, GamesRadar+, and IGN.

It was voted the best game of June by PlayStation Blog readers. It won two awards at AbleGamers's inaugural Video Game Accessibility Awards: Second Channel, for providing several ways to access information; and Helping Hand, for the presentation of in-game hints. At the 38th Golden Joystick Awards in November 2020, the game won all six awards for which it was nominated: Ultimate Game of the Year, Best Audio, Best Storytelling, Best Visual Design, PlayStation Game of the Year, and Studio of the Year for Naughty Dog. The game led the nominees for The Game Awards 2020 with 11 nominations, of which it won seven, the most in the show's history: Game of the Year, Best Game Direction, Best Narrative, Best Audio Design, Innovation in Accessibility, Best Action/Adventure, and Best Performance for Bailey. Following concerns from viewers, host and producer Geoff Keighley stated the awards were not rigged and there was no influence of Naughty Dog or its staff. He said the game was popular with players and media alike as proven by the Player's Voice award, in which The Last of Us Part II had come second to Ghost of Tsushima.

The game received five nominations at the 10th Annual New York Game Awards, including Game of the Year, Best Music, Best Writing, and Best Acting for Bailey and Johnson; it lost all to Hades. The Last of Us Part II received 24 nominations at the National Academy of Video Game Trade Reviewers Awards, the most in the show's history; it won eight in total, including Outstanding Direction in a Game Cinema, Franchise Adventure Game, Lead Performance in a Drama for Johnson and Bailey, and Supporting Performance in a Drama for Baker. It received 13 nominations at the 17th British Academy Games Awards, the most in the show's history; it won three awards: Animation, the publicly-voted EE Game of the Year, and Performer in a Leading Role for Bailey. It led the nominees at the 24th Annual D.I.C.E. Awards with 11 nominations, of which it won two: Outstanding Achievement in Animation and Outstanding Achievement in Story. It also led the 19th Annual Game Audio Network Guild Awards with 15 nominations and eight wins, and the 21st Game Developers Choice Awards with six nominations, of which it won one. It received the most nominations at the inaugural Global Industry Game Awards with 13, of which it won three: 3D Animation, Cinematography, and Story.

Accolades

Notes

References 



Last of Us Part II, The
The Last of Us